Julio Xavier Labayen (23 July 1926 – 27 April 2016) was a Filipino Discalced Carmelite and a Roman Catholic bishop. Ordained to the priesthood in 1955, he served as bishop of the Territorial Prelature of Infanta, Philippines from 1966 until 2003. He was among the first Filipino Discalced Carmelites in the 1950s. He was the first Filipino Discalced Carmelite bishop and the second bishop of the Prelature of Infanta.

He was a staunch defender of human rights, especially during the years of the Martial Law in the Philippines, being known to be one of the "Magnificent 7" who voiced their opposition against the Marcos regime.
In recognition of his efforts against authoritarian rule, his name was inscribed on the Wall of Remembrance at the Bantayog ng mga Bayani in 2016.

Aside from this, the bishop served in various capacities in promotion of the welfare and rights of the poor and the marginalized, primarily in his appointment as the first chair of the CBCP's National Secretariat for Social Action-Justice and Peace (NASSA).

Formation and Studies 

Julio, Jr. met Father Patrick Shanley, OCD in 1946, a meeting that led to the eventual entrance to the order. The young man formally entered the Order of Discalced Carmelites on 15 October 1948 (Feast of Santa Teresa de Jesús) with the entrance to the novitiate in Brookline, Massachusetts. Consequently, he received the Carmelite habit on 6 November and took the religious name Xavier.

On 7 November 1948, after a year in the novitiate, he professed simple vows as Brother Xavier of the Immaculate Heart of Mary. His solemn profession of vows took place on 14 May 1953 at Colegio Sta. Teresa in Rome.

As part of his seminary formation, Brother Xavier, OCD took the courses needed towards priesthood. In all these, he excelled and finished it with flying colors. He studied philosophy (1949-1952) at Holy Hill, Milwaukee, WI, graduating magna cum laude. He took his theology courses and master's degree in Theology (1952-1957), Teresianum, finishing cum laude.

He was also made to study canon law after his priesthood at Angelicum. He finished his master's degree in canon law, summa cum laude in 1959.

Priesthood and Episcopacy 
Father Xavier, OCD was ordained on 4 June 1955 in Colegio Sta. Teresa in Rome by Adeodato Cardinal Piazza (who was also a Discalced Carmelite). It was not until four years later that he was able to celebrate his first Solemn High Mass in Bacolod on 14 November 1949. As a priest, he was assigned as assistant parish priest of St. Joseph Parish in Polillo in 1959 then consequently its parish priest the next year. Yet, he will fill another assignment as apostolic administrator of the Prelature of Infanta on 23 June 1961.

On 26 July 1966 he was appointed as prelate of the Prelature of Infanta and Titular Bishop of Sinnuara. He was consecrated bishop on 8 September 1966 at the Carmelite church of Our Lady of Mount Carmel (now a national shrine and minor basilica) in New Manila, Quezon City. Rufino Jiao Cardinal Santos (Archbishop of Manila) was the principal consecrator along with the two principal co-consecrators Bishop Alfredo Maria Obviar (then Apostolic Administrator of Lucena) and Bishop Pedro Bantigue (then Auxiliary Bishop of Manila).

Bishop Labayen, OCD served the Prelature of Infanta until the Saint John Paul II approved his retirement on 28 June 2003 with the announcement of the appointment of his Carmelite confrere, Bishop Rolando Tirona, OCD.

Coat-of-Arms 
The heraldry of Bishop Labayen, OCD was designed by Prof. Galo B. Ocampo.

The dexter side (left of the viewer) represents the Prelature of Infanta, according to the practice of combining the arms of the bishop with his territorial jurisdiction. On the chief of the dexter (upper left) are symbols of the titular patrons of the prelature: the orb (Infant Jesus of Prague) and the lion (Saint Mark the Evangelist). On the base of the dexter (bottom left) is an azure background and fleur-de-lis representing the Blessed Virgin Mary and the three flowers symbolizing the Trinity.

The sinister side (right of the viewer) bears the personal blazon of the bishop. The chief of the sinister (upper right) is the arms of the Order of Discalced Carmelites to which the bishop belonged. On the base of the sinister (bottom right) is a sable and argent checkered which was the arms of the Labayen family.

His episcopal motto is "Dominus est" from the John 21:7 where the beloved disciple shouted "It is the Lord" and reflects a recognition of God in all circumstances of life.

Church of the Poor 

The Church in the Philippines declared during the Second Plenary Council of the Philippines](informally known as the PCP-II convoked in 1991) that "As we approach the year 2000, Christ bids this community—ourselves, the laity, religious and clergy of the Catholic Church in the Philippines—to be a Church of the Poor." This vision, first arose during the Second Vatican Council, upholding Catholic social teachings, were adapted by local conferences such as the Episcopal Conference of Latin America (CELAM) when they declared the "preferential option for the poor" and the Federation of Asian Bishops' Conferences (FABC) espousing the Church of the Poor in 1975.

Long before the declaration of PCP-II, Bishop Labayen, OCD was an ardent proponent of the Church of the Poor in the Philippines which was his brainchild in the Prelature of Infanta. The program prioritized to serve those neglected by the society: workers, indigenous people and others who relied on no one but themselves. As a shepherd, he immersed himself with the people and established dialogue in the grassroots, a concept the laity never imagined to happen. As such he became close to the heart of the people who loved him as a father.

Death 

Bishop Labayen died on 27 April 2016 at 6:52 AM. People poured from different walks of life during his wake in different locations: first in Quezon City, then to Baler, Aurora, and after to Infanta, Quezon. His remains was returned to his retirement place in Antipolo City where he was buried in a crypt under the congregation's chapel on 3 May 2016.

Authored works 
These are the books written by Bishop Labayen, OCD, among a plenitude of talks, articles and seminars:

 Revolution and the Church of the Poor (revised by himself in 1995)
 To be the Church of the Poor (1986)
 The Bishop, Builder-Servant of the Church of the Poor (1991)
 Crisis and Impasse: the Dark Night in St. John of the Cross (1991)
 Incarnational Spirituality (2004)

Awards 

 Gawad Kagitingan Award (Valour Award) during the 106th anniversary of Philippine Independence at the Monument of Heroes in Quezon City, 2014
 Father Neri Satur Award for Environmental Heroism for Climate Change Mitigation, 2009, for the Adopt-a-Mountain in Infanta, Quezon program
 Human Rights Defenders Award, 2015, given by the Task Force Detainees of the Philippines
 Bishop Labayen Self-Integrity Scholarship for 10 four-year scholarships, given by the Metro Infanta Foundation, June 2002

Founder of Institutes of Consecrated Life and Societies of Apostolic Life 
As a religious, Bishop Labayen, OCD recognized the gift of the religious and consecrated persons in the Church. As such he founded congregations to serve the Church in their own ways.

 Rural Missionaries of the Philippines
 Karmelo – Laan sa Pangarap ng Ama (Sambayanan ng mga Dukha) is an inculturated monastery of Discalced Carmelite nuns conceptualized in the spirit of the Church of the Poor (1979)
 Apostles in Contemporary Times (1984)
 Augustinian Missionaries of the Philippines (1999)
 Religious Community of the Alagad ni Maria (1990)
 Franciscans of Our Lady of the Poor (1991)

Founder of nongovernment organizations 
Among many groups, these are some of NGO's founded or co-founded by Bishop Labayen, OCD:

 Socio-Pastoral Institute (co-founder)
 Bishops' Businessmen's Conference
 Tipan
 Integrated Alternative Medical Health Service (INAM)
 Task Force Detainees of the Philippines (TFDP)
 Management Organizing for Development and Empowerment (MODE)
 New Rural Bank of San Leonardo
 Community Organizing for People Empowerment (COPE)
 Philippine Association of Human Rights Advocates (PAHRA)
 Kilusang Makabayang Ekonomiya (KME)
 Development for Women Network (DAWN)

References 
 Inlayo, Maria Dulce Emmanuel F., OCD. It is the Lord: The Life-Journey of Bishop Julio Xavier Labayen, OCD. Edited by Teresa R. Tunay. Quezon City: Claretian Publications, 2013.

Notes

1926 births
2016 deaths
21st-century Roman Catholic bishops in the Philippines
20th-century Roman Catholic bishops in the Philippines
Religious workers honored at the Bantayog ng mga Bayani